The Redwalls is the self-titled third album by Chicago-based rock band The Redwalls, released in the United States on October 23, 2007. The album was recorded in Sweden with producer Tore Johansson (Franz Ferdinand, The Cardigans) while under Capitol Records. Before its release Capitol merged with Virgin Records and the band was dropped. However, they retained the rights to the album and eventually signed with MAD Dragon UNLTD, an independent student collective run by Drexel University. Lead guitarist Andrew Langer called Capitol's relinquishing of the release rights "the best thing they could have ever done for us."

Track listing

Chart positions

References

The Redwalls albums
2007 albums
Albums produced by Tore Johansson